Janusz Rajmund Zalewski (15 August 1903 – 6 August 1944) was a Polish sailor. He competed in the mixed 6 metres at the 1936 Summer Olympics. Zalewski was wounded during the Warsaw Uprising and was killed in reprisals for the rebellion.

Personal life
Zalewski served in the Warsaw Uprising as part of the Home Army during the Second World War. He was wounded on 1 August attacking German supply warehouses, and was sent to recover at a hospital in Wola. He was killed on 6 August by German soldiers during the Wola massacre.

References

1903 births
1944 deaths
Date of death unknown
Olympic sailors of Poland
Sailors at the 1936 Summer Olympics – 6 Metre
Polish military personnel killed in World War II
Polish people executed by Nazi Germany
Home Army members
Resistance members killed by Nazi Germany
Polish male sailors (sport)
Warsaw Uprising insurgents